Rhizopogon luteolus is an ectomycorrhizal fungus used as a soil inoculant in agriculture and horticulture. It was deliberately introduced into Pinus radiata plantations in Western Australia after it was observed to improve tree growth.

References

External links
 

Rhizopogonaceae
Fungi described in 1817